Harold Herman "Stubby" Kruger (September 21, 1897 – October 7, 1965) was an American competition swimmer who represented the United States at the 1920 Summer Olympics in Antwerp, Belgium.  Kruger swam in the event final of the men's 100-meter backstroke and finished fifth overall.

Kruger married dancer and actress Evan-Burrows Fontaine in 1928 or 29.  A son Bobby was born to this union before their divorce in 1935.  Kruger was a colleague of Johnny Weissmuller's and performed at carnivals and fairs billed as the Incomparable Water Comedian. He also had a career in Hollywood as an actor and stunt double that began in the silent era and lasted well into the 1950s. His last film credit was as Spencer Tracy's double in The Old Man and the Sea. In 1986, Kruger was inducted into the International Swimming Hall of Fame as a "pioneer swimmer."

Sometime after his divorce, he married Annie Young. They are buried together at Diamond Head Memorial Park in Honolulu, Hawaii.

Filmography

See also
 List of members of the International Swimming Hall of Fame

References

External links
 Stubby Kruger (USA)  – Honor Pioneer Swimmer/Diver profile at International Swimming Hall of Fame
 

1897 births
1965 deaths
American male backstroke swimmers
American stunt performers
Olympic swimmers of the United States
Swimmers from Honolulu
Swimmers at the 1920 Summer Olympics
19th-century American people
20th-century American people